Diederik Hol (born 10 April 1972) is a Dutch Design Engineer, designer of the Dual Box inline skate frame and the Narrow Shape Cross-Section (NSX) ice blade, and founder/director of skate company CadoMotus Skating BV.

Education and early career
After obtaining his engineer's degree in Design Engineering from Delft University of Technology in the Netherlands, Hol became involved in a graduate project with Interraps - a Dutch producer of inline and ice skates - working on a planned improvement of the first (Viking) clapskate design with the aim of turning a 100-year-old patent into a product that could break ice speed skating world records.  He graduated having worked on the Rotrax skate, a complex clap skate conceived as a multiple-hinge frame aimed at controlling deformation and allowing for a more powerful push-off.

Product line designer
After spending time as a designer working on a wide variety of other projects, he was able to return to the niche skate design industry full-time in 1999 when approached by Sportsinline International BV to design an entire product line of inline skates for its Mogema brand.  With previous employer Interraps possessing the patent that basically covered all existing inline frames at the time, Hol was driven to come up with something completely new.  After a year working on the project, Hol completed the Dual Box inline frame. Results on the product were to come 2 years later in 2001 with the worldwide inline racing success of elite skaters of the period such as Jorge Botero (Colombia), Arnaud Gicquel (France) and Kalon Dobbin (New Zealand) using Dual Box frames in World Inline Cup and World Inline Speed Skating Championship events.

Ice speedskating
Subsequently, Hol returned his design focus to ice speedskating and, based on technologies being utilised in the development of hockey and figure skates, designed the Narrow Shape Cross-Section (NSX) ice blade. The NSX was the first ice skate produced under the Mogema name and was a departure from the traditional rigid, pre-bent racing blades used in longtrack speed skating, providing a straight blade that featured an adaptive radius.  The NSX product line was expanded by Mogema in response to growing market interest at the time, however in a traditionally change-resistant ice speedskating market the product never achieved a significant market share.

New business
Following the decommissioning of Sportsinline International by its parent company in 2006, Hol started work on his own company.  In February 2007, new skate company CadoMotus Skating BV appeared online and through a global network of distributors in the niche speed skating market with ice and inline speed skates.

References

External links
 CadoMotus - inline and ice speed skates

1972 births
Living people
21st-century Dutch inventors
Skating people
Delft University of Technology alumni
People from Apeldoorn